Hasköy is a village in the Enez District of Edirne Province in Turkey.

References

Villages in Enez District